Matthew or Matt Williams may refer to:

Sports

Baseball
Matt Williams (right-handed pitcher) (born 1959), American Major League Baseball player
Matt Williams (third baseman) (born 1965), American Major League Baseball player and manager
Matt Williams (left-handed pitcher) (born 1971), American Major League Baseball player
Matthew Williams (baseball) (born 1987), Australian baseball player

Rugby
Matt Williams (rugby union coach) (born 1960), Australian rugby union coach
Matt Williams (rugby union, born 1988), English rugby union player
Matt Williams (rugby union, born 1998), English rugby union player

Other sports
Matthew Williams (footballer) (born 1982), Welsh footballer
Matt Williams (equestrian) (born 1985), Australian show jumper
Matt Williams (soccer) (born 1987), American soccer player
Matthew Williams (cricketer) (born 1990), Zimbabwean cricketer
Matt Williams (basketball) (born 1993), American basketball player
Matt Williams (American football) (fl. 2008–2010), American football placekicker for the Texas Tech Red Raiders

Politics
Matt Williams (Australian politician) (born 1973)
Matt Williams (Nebraska politician) (born 1949)

Other
Matthew Williams (laborer) (1908–1931), lynching victim in the United States
Matthew Williams (designer), designer
Matthew O. Williams (born 1981), U.S. Army soldier and Medal of Honor recipient
Matt Williams (Internet entrepreneur) (born 1972), Internet entrepreneur
Matt Williams (TV producer) (born 1951), television producer
Matt Williams (radio presenter) (born 1971), BBC radio sports reporter and presenter
Matt Williams, archaeologist, member of the Time Team, and Digging for Britain presenter

See also
Matt Robinson (Neighbours), also known as Matt Williams, fictional character in the Australian soap opera Neighbours